Sophia of Lithuania (1371–1453), also known as Sofia Vitovtovna, was a Grand Princess consort of Muscovy by marriage to Vasili I of Russia. She was regent of Muscovy during the minority of her son from 1425 to 1434.

Life
She was the daughter of Vytautas the Great of Lithuania and his first wife, Anna. On 21 January 1391, while her father was engaged in the Lithuanian Civil War, she married Vasili I of Russia. She was the longest serving consort of Russia.

After Vasili's death in 1425 she became regent for their ten-year-old son Vasili II. Her father supported Vasili's claim to the throne, which was disputed by his uncle, Yuri of Zvenigorod.

Sophia was buried in the Ascension Convent; the sarcophagus was moved in 1929 to the Cathedral of the Archangel by Soviet authorities.

Children

She and Vasili I of Russia had at least nine children, five boys (of which only one survived to mature adulthood) and four girls:
Anna of Moscow (1393 – August 1417), wife of John VIII Palaiologos, died of bubonic plague
Yury Vasilievich (30 March 1395 – 30 November 1400)
Ivan Vasilievich (15 January 1396 or 1397 – 20 July 1417), died on the way from Kolomna to Moscow as a result of "pestilence", just six months after marrying the daughter of Prince Ivan Vladimirovich of Pronsk and receiving the inheritance of Nizhny Novgorod
Anastasia Vasilievna (d. 1470), wife of Vladymir Alexander, Prince of Kiev. Her husband was a son of Vladymir, Prince of Kiev. His paternal grandparents were Algirdas and Maria of Vitebsk.
Daniil Vasilievich (6 December 1400 – May 1402), died of pestilence
Vasilisa Vasilievna, wife of Alexander Ivanovich "Brukhaty", Prince of Suzdal, and Alexander Daniilovich "Vzmetenj", Prince of Suzdal.
Simeon Vasilievich (13 January – 7 April 1405), died of pestilence
Maria Vasilievna, wife of Yuri Patrikievich. Her husband was a son of Patrikas, Prince of Starodub, and his wife, Helena. His paternal grandfather was Narimantas.
Vasily II of Moscow (10 March 1415 – 27 March 1462)

References

External links
Her listing, along with her husband, in "Medieval lands" by Charles Cawley.

|-

1371 births
1453 deaths
Russian royal consorts
Gediminids
14th-century Lithuanian people
15th-century women rulers
Burials at Ascension Convent
14th-century Lithuanian women
14th-century Russian people
14th-century Russian women